Jon Bois (born September 24, 1982) is an American sports writer, video producer, and YouTuber. He is the creative director at SB Nation, a sports blogging network. Bois is known for his speculative fiction works on sports, such as 17776, its follow-up 20020, and The Tim Tebow CFL Chronicles.  He is also known for his documentary videos and their unique style.  Bois's work often covers strange incidents, statistical outliers, and less popular teams.

Early life and education
Bois was born on September 24, 1982, and is originally from Louisville, Kentucky. From the fifth grade until high school, Bois was homeschooled. He dropped out of college after one semester. Bois worked at RadioShack sometime in the early to mid 2000s, later publishing multiple articles detailing his personal experiences as an employee.

Career 
Bois started as an editor at SB Nation in 2009. From 2013 to 2015, Bois published "Breaking Madden," a series of articles in which he created unusual football scenarios in the Madden NFL video games. In August 2014, he published "The Tim Tebow CFL Chronicles," a sports story based on the fictional premise that NFL quarterback Tim Tebow had joined the Canadian Football League.

In May 2015, Bois published the first episode of a documentary video series called "Pretty Good." The series told true stories of unusual events, often related to sports, such as the career path of baseball player Lonnie Smith, professional poker, and the infamous 1904 Olympic marathon, but also including a variety of other topics such as the Lawnchair Larry flight and the TV series 24.  the series has thirteen episodes, the last of which was published in September 2017.

In 2016, Bois began another documentary video series called "Chart Party," in which he used statistical analysis to explore and understand sports stories. Of particular note, Bois published an episode in December 2016 called "Every NFL Score Ever," in which he discussed how football's scoring system makes some final game scores very unlikely, and coined the term "scorigami" to describe the act of achieving a never-before-seen final result. The video led one viewer to create a website to track new scorigami instances, and the term has seen usage in other sports publications. The series has also discussed topics such as the saddest punt in the world, how Barry Bonds’ 2004 season would have looked like if he had played without a bat, the NCAA Division I men's basketball tournament, and the career of Jeff Francoeur, who Bois describes as his “favorite worst baseball player”.

In July 2017, Bois published a serialized multimedia narrative called 17776, a work of speculative fiction describing unusual forms of American football played in the distant future. According to Bois, the story garnered four million pageviews from 700,000 unique visitors in two weeks. The series won a National Magazine Award for Digital Innovation from the American Society of Magazine Editors. Bois began a sequel to 17776, entitled 20020, in September 2020. A sequel to 20020, called 20021, was planned to be released in Spring 2021, but has been delayed.

A chapter of Upon Further Review, a collection of sports what-if scenarios compiled by editor Mike Pesca published in 2018, was written by Bois, with his scenario being "What If Basketball Rims Were Smaller Than Basketballs?"

In April 2018, Bois and fellow SB Nation personality Alex Rubenstein began the series "Dorktown", which followed a similar format and style as his prior series "Pretty Good", showcasing unusual events, statistics, and personalities from sports history. In 2020, Bois and Rubenstein released a 6-part special mini-series of Dorktown chronicling the history of the Seattle Mariners baseball franchise. A "Supercut Edition" of the film, running 220 minutes in length, was released on YouTube on September 24, 2020. The film would go on to win the Best Documentary Feature award from the Seattle Film Critics Society in February 2021, with its first episode, "This is not an endorsement of arson," being listed by The New York Times as one of the best episodes of TV of 2020. He and Rubenstein released a similar documentary on the Atlanta Falcons American football franchise throughout August and September 2021. Between March and April 2022, he and Rubenstein released a 4-part documentary on former MLB pitcher Dave Stieb. On June 26, 2022, he and Rubenstein released a documentary about the 1977 NFL Playoffs match between the Baltimore Colts and Pittsburgh Steelers, and the plane crash that happened after the game.

In 2018, Bois collaborated with Felix Biederman of Chapo Trap House on the five-part documentary "Fighting In the Age of Loneliness", presented in style influenced by British documentary filmmaker Adam Curtis, which focuses on the development of Mixed Martial Arts (MMA) from the early development of Brazilian Jiu-Jitsu and Vale Tudo in the development of more complex fighting styles. It focuses on the development of MMA as a mainstream sport, including Pride Fighting Championship and the development of Ultimate Fighting Championships, and their parallels to the 21st century neoliberal socio-political landscape of financial collapse and inequality. On December 29, 2020, a supercut edition of Fighting in the Age of Loneliness was released to YouTube to commemorate the Secret Base channel accumulating 1 million subscribers.

In 2019, Bois released a two-part series on professional athletes named Bob. Titled "The Bob Emergency," the series details the specific stories of athletes named Bob, the title referring to the dwindling numbers of such athletes, with Bois only tallying 10 active athletes named Bob at the series' end on May 21, 2019. Bois has previously written on this topic, referring to it as "The Bob Famine" in a 2012 article about Bob Sanders, believed to be the last Bob in major American sports.

On September 17, 2019, Bois and SB Nation video producer Kofie Yeboah started a video series called "Fumble Dimension". Similar to Bois's earlier "Breaking Madden", it consists of using in-game mechanics of sports video games to create unusual scenarios, usually with fan input.

Style 
Bois has a very distinctive audiovisual style, heavily utilizing Google Earth as a medium in which to place various visuals, making heavy use of newspaper articles, charts, and timelines to create a collage that builds over the runtime of a video.

His videos often make use of smooth jazz, from artists like Keith Mansfield and Alan Hawkshaw, as background music.

Bois's work often centers various sports statistics directly.  He has been praised for making them accessible to a general audience in a way that makes them interesting and gripping, rather than background material.  Bois has said that he is "making sports documentaries for people who don't watch sports."

Personal life 
Bois is a Kansas City Chiefs fan. He got married in June 2021.

Bibliography 
 2014: The Tim Tebow CFL Chronicles
 2017: 17776
 2018: "What If Basketball Rims Were Smaller Than Basketballs?" (part of Upon Further Review)
 2018: "The Stallion" (part of SB Nation's Forest of Fright)
 2020: 20020

Filmography

Documentaries

Video series

References

External links 
 Jon Bois at SB Nation
 

1982 births
Living people
21st-century American male writers
American sportswriters
American video artists
Data journalists
SB Nation
Writers from Louisville, Kentucky
American YouTubers